This list of Complutense University of Madrid alumni includes notable graduates of Complutense University of Madrid

Government 
Pre-20th century

 Don John of Austria – Victor of the Battle of Lepanto, Spanish Governor of the Netherlands, Grandee of Spain, the last Knight of Europe.
 Alexander Farnese, Duke of Parma and Piacenza.
 Cardinal Mazarin – 2nd Prime Minister of France (1642–1661), successor of Cardinal Richelieu.
 Gaspar de Borja y Velasco – Served as Primate of Spain, Archbishop of Seville, Archbishop of Toledo and viceroy of Naples.
 Gaspar Melchor de Jovellanos – Prime Minister of Spain, theorist behind the Constitution of 1812
 Nicolás Salmerón y Alonso – President of the First Spanish Republic
 Emilio Castelar y Ripoll – Journalist, Essayist, Minister during the First Spanish Republic

II Spanish Republic

 Manuel Azaña – Head of State & President of Spain at various points throughout the Second Spanish Republic
 Juan Negrín López – Last President of the Second Spanish Republic
 Gregorio Marañón – Spanish physician, scientist, historian, writer, philosopher and political reformer
 Julián Besteiro Fernández – Socialist Politician, Deputy during the Second Spanish Republic
 Clara Campoamor – Feminist Politician, Deputy during the Second Spanish Republic
 Victoria Kent – Essayist, Feminist, Deputy during the Second Spanish Republic
 Claudio Sánchez-Albornoz y Menduiña – Historian, Deputy during the Second Spanish Republic
 Fernando de los Ríos Urruti – Anarquist Politician during the Second Spanish Republic

Transition and Contemporary Administrations

 Adolfo Suárez – first democratically elected Prime Minister after the Franco regime
 Américo Castro – Politician, Spanish cultural historian, philologist, and literary critic
 José María Aznar – Former President of the Spanish Government (1996–2004)
 Javier Solana – European Union foreign policy chief and former NATO Secretary General
 Esperanza Aguirre – Former regional President of Madrid
 Enrique Barón Crespo – President of the European Parliament
 Manuel Fraga Iribarne – Former interior minister/father of the Spanish Constitution of 1978/founder and president of the Spanish conservative People's Party/former president of the Xunta de Galicia/member of the Spanish Senate
 María Teresa Fernández de la Vega – Former vice president of the Spanish Government (2004–)
 Marcelino Oreja Aguirre – Secretary General of the Council of Europe/Member of the European Parliament /European Commissioner for Transport/European Commissioner for Institutional Relations and Communication Strategy
 Manuel Prado y Colón de Carvajal – Spanish diplomat/Politician/Royal Senator/Administrator of the Royal Household

 Rodrigo Rato – Politician/former Spanish Minister of Economy and Finance/9th Chairman of the International Monetary Fund
 Josep Borrell – former president of the European Parliament
 Manuel Marín – former member of the European Commission and President during the interim Santer Commission/President of the Congress of Deputies of Spain
 José Bono – former president of Castile–La Mancha, former Defense Minister, former president of the Spanish Congress of Deputies
 Ana Palacio – former Spanish minister of foreign affairs
 Alfredo Pérez Rubalcaba – Chemist/ former minister of the Ministry of Education (Spain), former Defense Minister, former minister of the Spanish Interior Minister
 Elena Salgado – former Spanish Minister of Economy and Finance
 German Vargas Lleras – former Ministry of the Interior and Justice (Colombia)
 José María Barreda – former president of Castile–La Mancha
 José Manuel González Paramo – former member of the Executive Board of the European Central Bank
 Isabel Díaz Ayuso – Politician and president of the Community of Madrid
 Juan Pizarro Navarrete – former deputy and former member of the Parliament of Andalusia
Foreign Government Figures

 Luis J. Lauredo – former United States Ambassador to the Organization of American States and executive director of the First Summit of the Americas
 Mario Crisostomo Belisario - former Philippine Ambassador to Romania, Hungary, Consul, and Assistant Secretary of the Philippine Department of Foreign Affairs

Royalty

 Infanta Cristina of Spain – Spanish princess, the younger daughter of King Juan Carlos I and Queen Sofía of Spain.
 Letizia Ortiz Rocasolano – Queen consort of Spain
 Miriam, Princess of Turnovo – Spanish jewellery designer and member of the Bulgarian royal family

Journalism and literature 

 Antonio de Nebrija – writer, grammarian
 Antonio Machado – poet, member of the Generación del '98 literary movement
 Basilio Rodríguez Cañada – writer, president of the PEN Club of Spain
 Camilo José Cela – writer, poet, Nobel Prize in Literature (1989), Miguel de Cervantes Prize Recipient, member of the Generación del '50 literary movement
 Concepción Arenal – journalist, essayist, political figure
 Dámaso Alonso y Fernández de las Redondas – writer, poet, philologist, member of the Generación del '27 literary movement, Miguel de Cervantes Prize Recipient
 Enrique Tierno Galván – writer, politician
 Federico García Lorca – poet, playwright
 Paloma García Ovejero - journalist, news broadcaster, first woman vice director of the Holy See Press Office
 Félix Lope de Vega y Carpio – Spanish playwright
 Fermín Caballero – early journalist / publisher, Congressional Deputy

 Francisco Ayala – writer, Nobel Prize for Literature Candidate, Principe de Asturias Award for Literature, Miguel de Cervantes Prize Recipient
 Francisco de Quevedo – classical writer
 Gerardo Diego – writer, poet, Member of the Spanish Royal Academy, Member of the Generación del '27 literary movement, Miguel de Cervantes Prize Recipient
 Giannina Braschi – author of Empire of Dreams, Yo-Yo Boing!, and United States of Banana
 Jacinto Benavente – playwright, Nobel Prize in Literature (1922)
 Javier Marías – writer, translator, member of the Spanish Royal Academy
 José Echegaray y Eizaguirre – writer, Nobel Prize in Literature (1904)
 José Rodríguez Carracido – writer, pharmacist, chemist
 María Zambrano – writer, philosopher
 Mario Vargas Llosa – Peruvian writer (naturalized Spaniard), Principe de Asturias Award, Miguel de Cervantes Prize, Nobel Prize in Literature (2010)
 Miguel de Unamuno – writer, member of the Generación del '98 literary movement, Neo-Humanist Philosopher
 Mónica Martínez, journalist, television presenter
 Pío Baroja – writer, member of the Generación del '98 literary movement
 Ramiro Ledesma Ramos – writer, politician
 Torcuato Luca de Tena y Álvarez-Ossorio – journalist, founder of ABC
 Juan Ignacio Luca de Tena – journalist, playwright, diplomat
 Vicente Aleixandre – writer, poet, Nobel Prize in Literature (1970)
 Xosé Luís Méndez Ferrín – writer
 José Ortega Spottorno – journalist, founder of Alianza Editorial, co-founder of El País
 Jesús de Polanco – journalist, co-founder of El País, founder of Editorial Santillana, Grupo PRISA and Cadena SER
 Juan Luis Cebrián – journalist, co-founder and former editor-in-chief of El País, member of the Real Academia Española, head of Grupo PRISA

Philosophy 

 Antonio de Nebrija – Renaissance Humanist, Philologist
 Domingo de Soto – Philosopher, Theologian, Theorist at the Council of Trent
 Fernando Savater – Philosopher
 José Gaos y González Pola – Neo-Humanist Philosopher
 Jose Luis López Aranguren – Philosopher
 José Ortega y Gasset – Neo-Humanist Philosopher, Founder of Ratio-Vitalism, Writer, Journalist, Deputy during the Second Spanish Republic
 Julián Marías – Philosopher
 Francisco Elías de Tejada y Spínola – Philosopher, Law Theorist, Political Theorist
 María Isidra de Guzmán y de la Cerda – First woman to earn a doctorate in Spain, Philosopher
 Raimon Panikkar – Philosopher, Theologian, Scholar of Comparative Philosophy of Religion
 Tomás de Villanueva – Roman Catholic Saint, Archbishop of Valencia, Theologian
 Xavier Zubiri Apalategui – Philosopher, Philologist
 María Zambrano – Philosopher

History 

 Ambrosio de Morales – Historian
 Francisco Giner de los Ríos – Historian
 Juan de Mariana – Historian, Political Theorist
 Beatriz Rico – Neurologist
 José Amador de los Ríos – Historian
 Manuel Colmeiro Penido – Economist, Historian, Jurist
 Marcelino Menéndez y Pelayo – Scholar/Historian
 Ramón Menéndez Pidal – Historian
 Salvador Salort-Pons – Art Historian

Medicine 

 Carlos Jiménez Díaz – Medical Pioneer
 Florestán Aguilar – Medical Pioneer
 Galo Leoz – Ophthalmologist and supercentenarian
 Gregorio Marañón – Physician/Scientist/Historian/Writer/Philosopher
 José Protasio Rizal Mercado y Alonso Realonda – Philippine national hero, polyglot, writer, biologist, ophthalmologist, and author.
 Santiago Ramón y Cajal – Nobel Prize in Medicine (1906), founder of modern Neuroscience
 Javier de Felipe - Neuroscience.
 Severo Ochoa – Nobel Prize in Medicine (1959)

Mathematics and sciences 

 Albert Einstein – Doctor of Science degree Honoris Causa (first one he accepted from a European University)
 Antonia Ferrín Moreiras mathematician, professor, and the first Galician woman astronomer
 Ángel Martín Municio – chemist/pharmacist/President of the Spanish Royal Academy of Sciences
 Antonio Luna – Philippine General, Commanding General of the Philippine Revolutionary Army (Philippine–American War), Doctorate in Pharmacy (1890)
 Blas Cabrera y Felipe – physicist/President of the Spanish Royal Academy of Sciences, member of the Solvay Conference
 Bruno Brandão Fischer –  Brazilian professor
 Carlos Sánchez del Río – physicist/President of the Spanish Royal Academy of Sciences
 Eduardo Torroja Caballé – mathematician, disciple of Karl Georg Christian von Staudt, member of the Spanish Royal Academy of Sciences
 Enrique Moles Ormella – physicist
 Federico Mayor Zaragoza – pharmacist/Director-General of UNESCO from 1987 to 1999
 Juan Manuel Rodríguez Parrondo – physicist
 José Cuatrecasas – botanist
 José Rodríguez Carracido – chemist/pharmacist/Dean at the Faculty of Pharmacy/Rector of the Complutense University of Madrid /President of the Spanish Royal Academy of Sciences
 Juan Luis Arsuaga – biologist/paleontologist
 Julio Rey Pastor – mathematician
 Margarita Salas – scientist/President of the Instituto de España
 Miguel Catalán Sañudo – scientist
 Myriam Gorospe – scientist
 Sixto Ríos – mathematician/statistician
 Jesús Huerta de Soto – economist, law scholar
 Juan Ignacio Cirac Sasturain – quantum physicist, Wolf Prize in Physics 2013
 Vicente Lopez Ibor Mayor – solar energy
 Jimena Quirós – Oceanographer, scientist of the Spanish Institute for Oceanography (IEO).
 María Teresa Miras Portugal – Spanish scientist, pharmacist, biochemist, molecular biologist and Emeritus professor.

Film 

 Alejandro Amenábar – Oscar-winning Filmmaker (did not graduate)
 Luis Buñuel – Surrealist Filmmaker
 Santiago Segura – Actor, Filmmaker

Other 

 Ángel Sanz Briz – Spanish diplomat credited with saving thousands of Hungarian Jews from Nazi persecution during World War II
 Rosanna Castrillo Diaz – artist
 Chema Madoz – Photographer
 Vicente Blanco Gaspar, ambassador and writer 
 Concepción Arenal – Spanish feminist writer and activist
 Emilio García Gómez – International authority on Arab culture
 Fernando Cordero Cueva – Ecuadorian politician and architect
 Hildegart Rodríguez Carballeira – Girl genius of the 1920s and renowned Socialist activist and Sexual Reformer
 Cristina Lasvignes – radio and television broadcaster
 José Benedicto Luna Reyes – Filipino jurist
 José Antonio Llorente – Founder of Llorente & Cuenca
 Miguel Álvarez-Fernández – Sound artist and theorist
 Valentín García Yebra – philologist and translation scholar
 Fabio Hurtado – Artist
 Francisco Javier López Díaz – theologian
 Alejandra Andreu – Miss International 2008
 Luisa R. Seijo Maldonado – Activist, social worker and professor
 Eva Navarro – Artist
 Miren Ortubay Fuentes – Lawyer, criminologist, professor
 Gloria Oyarzabal – Visual artist
 Ronald Duterte – Filipino mayor

References